Jewish Motorcyclists Alliance (JMA) is an umbrella organization for Jewish motorcycle clubs.  
The JMA's affiliate clubs consist of independent motorcycle riding clubs with JMA membership criteria. A member club designates a representative to serve on the JMA Council.

The JMA is the home of Jewish motorcyclists from around the world. The JMA is a worldwide association of Jewish motorcycle clubs that upon its formation included organized groups in the United States, Canada, Israel, England and Australia, representing over 2,500 Jewish motorcycle enthusiasts. The common thread is the religion; however membership or admittance to the member clubs is not dictated by faith or brand of motorcycle: riders of any denomination or brand of bike are welcome.

History 
A meeting was set up by King Ken of the Semites On Bikes and Scott Wynn of the Chai Riders. The original meeting took place at Mike's Famous Harley Davidson in Delaware on October 3, 2004. Five of those original clubs made the meeting. There was a total of 69 bikes and about 100 people. Although it was planned as just a "Meet and Greet", from that meeting grew the concept of the first Ride to Remember, honoring the anniversary of the freedom from the death camps in Europe. The Ride to Remember took place in Washington, DC, in May 2005 under the auspices of the newly named Jewish Motorcyclists Alliance (JMA). Five of the six original clubs were the founding members of the JMA. The founding members are Chai Riders, Hillel's Angels, King David Bikers, Tribe (Washington D.C.), and Yidden On Wheels.

At that time, JMA had a name and people got together under the label, but there was no formal organization. During the early part of 2006, six new clubs joined the original five, with the addition of Tribe MC (Seattle) The Sabra Riders (Atlanta), The Chai Riders (Detroit), The Chaiway Riders (Chicago), Or Tikva (Chicago), and YOW (Australia). The JMA also became formally organized: a Charter & By-laws were instituted so that conduct of JMA business for current and future members would be guided by rules.  To date, there are 44 registered clubs affiliated with the JMA and several more in the planning stage.

Ride to Remember
The Ride to Remember (R2R) has become the de facto defining event for the JMA and will occur annually at a venue to be selected by the JMA’s governing council.

R2R 2006 was held in Whitwell, TN, to honor the staff and students of its middle school for their efforts in the Paper Clips Project. R2R 2007 was held in New York City in May, 2007.  In May 2008, the Jewish Motorcyclists Alliance rode its motorcycles to Omaha, Nebraska for the "Illuminating the Past to Protect the Future" event in support of the Heartland Holocaust Education Fund (HHEF). 2009 R2R enjoyed 215 attendees who, through their collective efforts, raised $57,000 for the Holocaust Research and Lending Library in  Savannah and The Remember Project in Charleston. The 2010 Ride to Remember took place in Chicago/Skokie on June 10–13 and followed the route of the Skokie Nazi March 1977, ending at the Illinois Holocaust Museum. Several different JMA affiliated bike clubs have hosted the annual Ride 2 Remember. So far those cities are:
 2006 in Whitwell, TN
 2007 in New York, NY
 2008 in Omaha, NE
 2009 in Charleston, SC
 2010 in Chicago, IL
 2011 in Virginia Beach
 2012 in Toronto, Canada
 2013 in Orange County, California
 2014 in Oswego, New York 
 2015 in Nashville, Tennessee
 2016 in Birmingham, Alabama
 2017 in Providence, Rhode Island
 2018 in Cleveland, Ohio
 2019 in St. Louis, Missouri
 2020 in San Diego California was cancelled due to the COVID19 outbreak, and has been rescheduled for 2022.
 2021 None held due to Covid pandemic
 2022 scheduled for San Diego, CA

Philosophy 
"As individuals, we share the fundamental passion to ride motorcycles, but we are drawn to each of our own clubs by our common faith and heritage as members of the Jewish faith.

The common thread is our religion, regardless of the degree and manner in which we choose to observe the Jewish faith. The admission of a prospective club for membership into the JMA is not predicated upon the degree to which the members of a Jewish club observes or practices the Jewish faith, or by the brands of motorcycles that its members may ride."

Mission 
The mission of the Jewish Motorcyclists Alliance, and by extension the forum is to create a global internet environment whereby members of the Jewish faith who ride motorcycles can congregate to share and exchange ideas and opinions about matters of concern to the Jewish community at large, as well as issues specifically concerning motorcycles and motorcycle riding.

See also
List of motorcycle clubs

References

Jewish clubs and societies
Motorcyclists organizations
Clubs and societies in the United States